Edvard Larsen (Martin Edvard Larsen; 27 October 1881 – 10 September 1914) was a Norwegian triple jumper. He represented Kristiania IF.
 
At the 1908 Summer Olympics held in London he won the bronze medal with a jump of 14.39 metres. This remained his career best jump. At the 1912 Summer Olympics he finished sixth with 14.06 metres, and he also competed for the 4 x 100 metres relay team that was disqualified. He became Norwegian champion in triple jump in 1900, 1906, 1908 and 1911  and in long jump in 1906 and 1908. Larsen died of an illness in Oslo, 32 years old.

References

1881 births
1914 deaths
Norwegian male triple jumpers
Athletes (track and field) at the 1908 Summer Olympics
Athletes (track and field) at the 1912 Summer Olympics
Olympic athletes of Norway
Olympic bronze medalists for Norway
Medalists at the 1908 Summer Olympics
Olympic bronze medalists in athletics (track and field)